Bring on the Comets is the third studio album by American indie rock band VHS or Beta. It was released on August 28, 2007 on Astralwerks.

Release
On March 26, 2007, VHS or Beta announced they were releasing their third studio album.

Tour
In support of the album, the band went on tour of North America, starting on August 2, 2007 at Popscene in San Francisco, and finished up at Headliners Music Hall in Louisville, Kentucky on September 29, 2007.

Critical reception
Bring On the Comets was met with "mixed or average" reviews from critics. At Metacritic, which assigns a weighted average rating out of 100 to reviews from mainstream publications, this release received an average score of 53 based on 12 reviews.

In a review for AllMusic, critic reviewer Jason Lymangrover wrote: "The grooves that were once the cornerstone for their early work are much less noticeable here, as they've been draped with grandiose, sweeping choruses. Becoming more concise and memorable songwriters is a good thing, but now the result is too much like straight-up '80s pop sprinkled with dance-punk sensibilities. The songs aren't remarkable and they aren't bad, they're just there." Annie Zaleski of Alternative Press describe the album as "quite a bit slicker and sonically feels as if it could fill an arena-but lacks the personality of the prior album." Nate Patrin of Pitchfork said: "Bring on the Comets doesn't prove that good rock is harder to make than good disco, just that it's a lot easier to make boring."

Writing for Spin, writer Stacey Anderson wrote: "Bring on the Comets is ultimately a bland regression. Percolating synthesizers bleed into the album's unrelenting mid-tempo beat, as Craig Pfunder mewls like Robert Smith, highbred Sloane-y accent and all. Even the mix is tinny, like a fuzzy trip through an unremarkable memory."

Track listing

Personnel 

Musicians
 Craig Pfunder – Guitar, pano, vocals
 Mark Guidry – Drums
 Mark Palgy – Bass
 Jim James – Guitar (acoustic), vocals (background)
 Bo Koster – Piano

Production
 Brandon Mason – Producer, engineer, mixing
 Mark Petaccia – Engineer
 Fred Kevorkian – Mastering
 Errol Kolosine – A&R
 Carl Broemel – Pedal steel
 Greg Foley – Design, cover art

References

External links
VHS or Beta official website
VHS or Beta on MySpace
Astralwerks Records

2007 albums
VHS or Beta albums
Astralwerks albums